Squadriglia 91a was one of the later fighter squadrons that the Italian Army created, on 1 May 1917. Because it drew an experienced cadre of pilots from pre-existing 70a Squadriglia, the squadron scored 14 victories within its first month of flying combat. As a result, it became known as "the squadron of aces". The new unit was immediately drawn into the ongoing Battles of the Isonzo in northern Italy. In September 1917, the squadron would serve as test pilots of the universally condemned SIA 7 multipurpose aircraft.

The squadron fought in the disastrous Battle of Caporetto in late 1917 and suffered through the subsequent retreat. On 11 April 1918, it returned to combat at Quinto di Treviso, with an added task of flying ground support missions. After Italy's top ace, Francesco Baracca was killed on such a mission, King Victor Emmanuel III renamed the squadron to honor the fallen ace. 91a Squadriglia would end the war credited with 60 aerial victories for a cost of six killed. Nine pilots scored five or more victories while serving with the squadron.

History
Squadriglia 91a of the Corpo Aeronautico Militare was established on 1 May 1917, drawing upon the existing 70a Squadriglia for its start. The new unit deployed to Istrana, near the ongoing Battles of the Isonzo, on 6 June 1917, with the objective of supporting ground action in the Trentino. It scored 14 victories within its first month of operations, largely because it included such experienced pilots as Francesco Baracca, Luigi Olivari, Ferruccio Ranza, and Fulco Ruffo di Calabria. Indeed, the 91a Squadriglia gained the nickname Squadriglia degli assi (Squadron of the aces).

In September 1917, the squadron evaluated the new SIA 7 for fighter use and unanimously turned it down. The squadron was then drawn into the fighting at the Battle of Caporetto, losing two ace pilots in October. After a withdrawal caused by the Italian defeat at Caporetto, the squadron settled into winter quarters at Padova and refurbished itself. Foul weather prevented winter operations, with the idle period extending into the new year.

On 11 April 1918, after moving to Quinto di Treviso, the 91a Squadriglia acquired an additional tactical role in flying trench strafing mission. Italy's leading flying ace of the war Francesco Baracca would be killed flying such a sortie on 19 June 1918. Within a few days, King Victor Emmanuel III decreed that the squadron be renamed to honor the fallen ace. By 31 August, the squadron had 25 aircraft on strength, but only 16 pilots. The 91a Squadriglia would fight through war's end. It would claim 60 aerial victories for the war, while suffering six casualties.

Commanding officers
 Maggiore Guido Tacchini: 1 May 1917-5 June 1917
 Francesco Baracca: 6 June 1917
 Bartolomeo Costantini: 24 December 1917 - 24 January 1918
 Francesco Baracca: 24 January 1918 - KIA 19 June 1918
 Fulco Ruffo di Calabria: 21 June 1918 - 18 September 1918
 Ferruccio Ranza: 18 September 1918 through war's end

Duty stations
 Santa Caterina: 1 May 1917
 Istrana: 6 June 1917
 Santa Caterina: 29 June 1917
 La Comina: ca November 1917
 Arcade, Italy: ca November 1917
 Padua: ca November 1917
 Quinto di Treviso: 11 April 1918

Notable members
Nine aces scored at least five of their victories while flying with 91a Squadriglia.
 Francesco Baracca (KIA)
 Pier Ruggero Piccio
 Fulco Ruffo di Calabria
 Ferruccio Ranza
 Bartolomeo Costantini
 Gastone Novelli
 Giorgio Pessi
 Giovanni Sabelli (KIA)
 Cesare Magistrini

Aircraft
Squadron insignia was a black griffon, although this was sometimes supplemented by other personal markings of the individual pilot.
 Nieuport 11
 Spad VII

Endnotes

References
 Franks, Norman; Guest, Russell; Alegi, Gregory.  Above the War Fronts: The British Two-seater Bomber Pilot and Observer Aces, the British Two-seater Fighter Observer Aces, and the Belgian, Italian, Austro-Hungarian and Russian Fighter Aces, 1914–1918: Volume 4 of Fighting Airmen of WWI Series: Volume 4 of Air Aces of WWI. Grub Street, 1997. , .
 Guttman, Jon. SPAD VII Vs Albatros D III: 1917-18. Osprey Publishing, 2011. , 9781849084758.

Italian Air Force
Military units and formations of Italy in World War I
Military units and formations established in 1917
1917 establishments in Italy
Squadriglie of Italy